け, (in hiragana) or ケ, (in katakana) is one of the Japanese kana, each of which represents one mora. Both represent . The shape of these kana come from the kanji 計 and 介, respectively.

A handakuten (゜) does not occur with ke in normal Japanese text, but it may be used by linguists to indicate a nasal pronunciation .

Stroke order

Other communicative representations

 Full Braille representation

 Computer encodings

References

See also 

 Small ke (ヶ)

Specific kana